Wadi Rabie is a settlement of Tripoli in Libya.

References 

Sahara
Baladiyat of Libya